Edmund Lyndeck (October 4, 1925 – December 14, 2015) was an American actor and musical theatre performer. He is best known for originating the roles of Judge Turpin in Sweeney Todd and Cinderella’s Father in Into the Woods. His other Broadway credits include 1776, Mrs. Warren's Profession, A Doll's Life, and Merlin, and he also played Sir Danvers Carew in the 1990 world premiere of Jekyll & Hyde.

Stage
Lyndeck, a former college professor, spent over a dozen years in stock and regional theater before making his Broadway debut in the original production of 1776. After originating the role of John Witherspoon, Lyndeck went on to play Stephen Hopkins, Dr. Lyman Hall, and Charles Thomson before ending up on tour as John Dickinson.

His best-known role is the evil Judge Turpin in the original production of Stephen Sondheim's Sweeney Todd, which he also repeated for the first national tour, the 1980 television broadcast, and a 1994 production at the North Shore Music Theatre. He earned a Drama-Logue Award for his performance in the tour's Los Angeles berth. He followed up Sweeney Todd with another Stephen Sondheim musical, Into the Woods, originating the role of Cinderella's Father and later playing the Mysterious Man as well. His other Broadway credits include Mrs. Warren's Profession, A Doll's Life, and Merlin.

Lyndeck worked frequently in Pennsylvania regional theater.  For many years he was a fixture at the Pittsburgh Civic Light Opera — most notably as Scrooge in their annual musical version of A Christmas Carol, a role he performed almost every year from 1992 to 2007.

Film and television
Lyndeck appeared occasionally on film and television. He was a contract player on a now-defunct soap opera, The Doctors, and has had guest roles in series like Ed, The Cosby Show, and Law & Order: Special Victims Unit. His best-known film role is as the marijuana-smoking grandfather in Road Trip; he is also known for his appearance in Adam Sandler's Big Daddy as Mr. Herlihy, You Don't Mess with the Zohan as the Pharmacist, and his most recent appearance in The Notorious Bettie Page. He also did voiceovers for numerous television and film documentaries.

Death
Lyndeck died December 14, 2015, aged 90.

Acting credits

Theatre

Film

Television

Further reading
 Brown, Dennis.  Actors Talk: Profiles and Stories from the Acting Trade.  New York: Limelight, 1999.  (Lyndeck is one of the actors interviewed.)

References

External links
 
 
 Brief interview with Lyndeck about Stephen Sondheim
 Obituary - Playbill'

1925 births
2015 deaths
American male musical theatre actors
American male film actors
American male soap opera actors
American male television actors
Male actors from Baton Rouge, Louisiana
Place of death missing